Javier Manterola Armisén (born 1936, Pamplona) is a Spanish civil engineer and professor at the Escuela Superior de Ingenieros de Madrid. Manterola is particularly known for his work as a bridge designer of the engineering firm Carlos Fernández Casado. He is a member of the Real Academia de Bellas Artes de San Fernando.

Career
Probably, his best known work is the Puente de La Pepa, opened in 2015. This bridge has become the main access to the city of Cádiz. Another of his most important designs is the Engineer Carlos Fernández Casado bridge in the AP-66 which spans a part of the Barrios de Luna reservoir in León, which was a world record for a decade in several categories and is still the second longest span in Spain, after the above-mentioned La Pepa Bridge. Author of many bridges in Zaragoza, Manterola designed the Manuel Giménez Abad Bridge for Zaragoza's third ring road (Z-30) and the Barranco de la Muerte aqueduct, structure for the Canal Imperial de Aragón to span the previously mentioned Z-30. For the Expo 2008, Manterola designed a pedestrian bridge called Pasarela del Voluntariado. Another of his designs is the bridge on the Ebro for the Spanish high speed railway line Madrid-Barcelona. It is also the author of Puente de Andalucía on the Guadalquivir in Córdoba and Puente de las Delicias in Sevilla. In Vizcaya, Manterola is the author of the Bridge Euskalduna on the Estuary of Bilbao and several bridges for the Supersur motorway.

Manterola has also participated in numerous restoration projects of historic bridges, like the Puente Nuevo in Murcia (2001–2003) in which a city bridge closed to traffic due to structural reasons was transformed into a pedestrian bridge retaining the original structure during the restoration.

Honours and awards
 2006: International Award of Merit in Structural Engineering from the International Association for Bridge and Structural Engineering

References

Bibliography

External links (Spanish)

 Aguiló Alonso, Miguel (2007). Javier Manterola, más allá de la funcionalidad y la belleza. Ingenieria Y Territorio, 79, p. 36-43.

1936 births
Living people
Spanish bridge engineers
Spanish civil engineers
People from Pamplona
Real Academia de Bellas Artes de San Fernando alumni